Tiara Anugrah Eka Setyo Andini (born September 26, 2001), known professionally as Tiara Andini, is an Indonesian singer and actress. She was the runner-up of the tenth season of Indonesian Idol which was broadcast by RCTI in 2019–2020. In Idol, she was known as the girl who received a titanium ticket from one of the judges. She is the only titanium ticket recipient to ever make it through to the final round in the history of Indonesian Idol. She was awarded the "Best Newcomer" from 23rd Anugerah Musik Indonesia Awards, and "Best New Asian Artist Indonesia" from 2020 Mnet Asian Music Awards.

Early life and education 
Tiara was born with the name Tiara Anugrah Eka Setyo Andini on September 23, 2001, in Jember Regency, East Java Province. Tiara, who is of Dutch descent, is the eldest of three children, from couple Nugroho Ediyono Deddy and Sari Yoshida Setyoastri. Tiara has a younger sister named Aurelia Anugrah and a younger brother named Holland Mauricio. Her Netherlands blood comes from lineage of her mother. Tiara was born into a family that adheres to Islam and is of Javanese ethnicity. Both of her parents work in the arts as musicians. Tiara's father is a music arranger while Tiara's mother is a singer.

Born into a family with a background in music, Tiara was introduced to the world of music from a young age by frequently playing songs by Melly Goeslaw and Titi DJ. Tiara's singing talent had begun to show since she was in kindergarten. When she was in 5th grade, she took vocal lessons and was directed by her vocal teacher to become a festival singer. Tiara also knows various genres of music from Kroncong to Mandarin Chinese music. In her school days, her friends did not support Tiara's decision to become a singer. There is also a tendency to underestimate Tiara's singing ability. Tiara has also participated in The Voice Kids Indonesia event but failed. Apart from singing, Tiara is also studying modeling. Since childhood, Tiara has joined and is an active member of the Jember Fashion Carnaval as a child model. Tiara also involved actively in the Jember Indonesian Paskibraka Troops.

Tiara attended elementary school at SD Al-Furqan Jember from 2008 to 2014. After that, Tiara continued her education at SMP Negeri 3 Jember and in 2017 Tiara continued her education to SMA Muhammadiyah 3 Jember majoring in science. Tiara's parents enrolled her in an Islamic school so that, although she worked in the arts, Tiara would have a strong religious education. When she was in high school, Tiara was actively involved in extra-curricular music activities under the direction of Danial Soemba.

Career

2017–2018: Early career 
Early in her career, Tiara often participates in local-scale singing talent contests. Tiara was a known finalist of Bintang Radio Indonesia and Asean RRI Jember in 2017. In 2018, Tiara was selected as a prototype fashion model for the Jember Fashion Carnaval with the theme of South Korea at the closing of the 2018 Asian Games. At the event, Tiara also had the opportunity to share a moment with the South Korean idol group, Super Junior.

Continuing to talent contests on television, Tiara participated in the third season of The Voice Indonesia, in which she failed her audition performing the song "Bang Bang" by Jessie J, Ariana Grande and Nicki Minaj. Before becoming as publicly known as she is today, Tiara also worked as a wedding singer, often singing Mandarin songs at Chinese weddings. Tiara received job offers almost every week. At the time, Tiara's first income was approximately 100,000 IDR ($6.89).

2019–2020: Indonesian Idol, debut single "Gemintang Hatiku", acting debut and presenter 
In 2019, Tiara again participated in the talent search event, Indonesian Idol. During the audition, Tiara performed Raisa's song "Could it Be" and got a titanium ticket from Judika. Because of this, Tiara is known as the girl who received the titanium ticket in the tenth season and she is the only recipient of the titanium ticket who ever make it through to the final round in Indonesian Idol history. When competing Tiara had an official fan club founded on November 26, 2019—when Tiara was in the top 13, named "Mootiara" which stands for "Mood Tiara Andini".

After passing the audition stage and going through a competition quarantine process for 5 months, on March 2, 2020, Tiara was named the runner-up. As the runner-up of the tenth season of Indonesian Idol, Tiara received a cash prize of 100,000,000 IDR, as well as one unit of the All New Nissan Livina MPV car. After the show, Tiara signed a contract with the record label Universal Music Indonesia and was managed by Star Media Nusantara, an artist management company owned by MNC Group.

From Indonesian Idol, Tiara got a winning song entitled "Gemintang Hatiku" which became her first single as a singer. There are two versions of the song, Tiara sings a dance pop version of this song. This song succeeded in bringing Tiara to win the award as "Best Newcomer" from the 2020 Anugerah Musik Indonesia Awards and the award as "Best New Asian Artist Indonesia" from the 2020 Mnet Asian Music Awards.

Two months after graduating from Indonesian Idol, Tiara made her acting debut in Amanah Wali 4 drama series as Tiara, a supporting role character from episodes 26 to 29 which aired on the RCTI television station in May 2020.

On July 1, 2020, Tiara was lined up to presenter the event Dahsyatnya 2020 which was broadcast by RCTI, she joined 3 other presenters, namely Ayu Dewi, Denny Cagur, and Raffi Ahmad. Continued on July 29, 2020, Tiara was lined up to be the presenter with Luna Maya at Tokopedia: Waktu Indonesia Belanja TV Show which presented a special appearance from South Korean boy band, BTS. This event was broadcast by Indosiar and SCTV television stations.

On August 8, 2020, Tiara became one of the performers at the Smartfren WOW Virtual Concert which was broadcast live in three countries, namely Indonesia, England and South Korea. In Indonesia, this event is broadcast by SCTV. In this event, Tiara is trusted to have a duet with one of the legends of Indonesian music, the late Didi Kempot using the concept of holograms, extended reality (XR) and interactive virtual audience technology.

2021–present: Arti untuk Cinta, Tiara Andini and film debut 
On February 21, 2021, Tiara sang a duet with Thai actor Bright Vachirawit at the Giveaway Roboguru Show. This event was broadcast by 9 television stations, namely Indosiar, Trans7, Trans TV, RCTI, GTV, SCTV, MNCTV, RTV, and NET.

A year after graduating from Indonesian Idol, Tiara was joined by Arsy Widianto to collaborate on a music project. This project was originally a music series consisting of four interconnected songs, starting with the song "Cintanya Aku" and ending with "Bahaya". On March 12, 2021, the music series was packaged and released as an extended play entitled Arti untuk Cinta with the addition of one new song to the album track. Four songs in this album were performed in collaboration and a song was performed solo by Arsy Widianto, namely "Padamu Luka". The word 'Arti' used in the title is an abbreviation of the names Arsy and Tiara. In the making of this album, Indonesian musician Yovie Widianto was assisted as a songwriter and as a producer assisted by Adrian Kitut. Arti untuk Cinta has won the award as "Best Pop Album" from the 2021 Anugerah Musik Indonesia Awards.

After she postponed going to college for a year to pursue her career. In 2021, Tiara enrolled at Multimedia Nusantara University, where she chose S-1 level in the Communication Science study program.

Two days before the release of her debut album, she was picked as Spotify's Indonesian Artist of the Month in the context of the Equal campaign program. In the campaign, her photo was chosen to be placed on a digital billboard at Times Square in New York, United States. On December 17, 2021, she released her first studio album which has a homonymous title with her stage name. The album contains eight tracks of which five singles have been previously released. Celebrating the release of her debut album, she also held an Afterparty event which aired exclusively through the YouTube Premium service on the album's release date.

On December 30, 2021, Tiara along with other musicians such as Raisa, Noah, Weird Genius, and Erwin Gutawa were involved in a music concert titled Suryanation: Suara Cahaya Nusantara which was broadcast live by SCTV with the theme of Indonesia's fighting spirit to enter 2022. Suryanation: Suara Cahaya Nusantara is the first music concert and program on Indonesian television that uses extended reality (XR) technology throughout the event.

On January 16, 2022, Tiara along with Gangga Kusuma, Nadin Amizah, Juicy Luicy, and Kaleb J were included in the list of 5 outstanding young musicians of Spotify Wrapped 2021.

In May 2022, Tiara started her first concert tour, entitled Bahaya (Mantan) Terindah Live Tour. Her first concert in Bandung attracted a more than 2,700 people.

Tiara made her film debut by starring in the film titled My Sassy Girl directed by Fajar Bustomi, which is a remake of the 2001 South Korean film of the same name. Tiara was cast as the main role alongside Jefri Nichol. The film premiered in cinemas on June 23, 2022.

Artistry

Influences and voice 
Since her debut in Indonesian Idol, her voice has been noted by powerful people in the music industry. Indonesian diva, Rossa commented that Tiara's voice is a "money voice" (most wanted by music producers). Indonesian musician, Yovie Widianto said that Tiara has an "almost similar voice color" to Indonesian singer Raisa, whom Tiara idolizes and is inspired by. South Korean musician, Ryeowook of Idol group Super Junior also stated that Tiara's voice is "beautiful". Tiara who loves K-pop music also regards Kim Jennie, a member of K-pop group Blackpink as a role model for her career in Indonesian music industry. Tiara stated she's "motivated" to raise the quality of her music along with her dancing skills. This is apparent in her singles, "Gemintang Hatiku" and "Hadapi Berdua" in which she displays her ability to sing while dancing.

The influence of South Korean pop culture on Tiara's musical style can also be seen in several of her music videos. The Arti untuk Cinta music series videos, of singles "Hadapi Berdua" and "Buktikan", was produced with the style of South Korean dramas in mind. In addition, Tiara also released a song recorded in Korean language which was featured on her EP Arti untuk Cinta.

Musical style 

Tiara is known as a singer of pop ballads. Most of the songs she released have a slow tempo and melancholy tone. Her first EP, Arti untuk Cinta, consists entirely of pop ballads with lyrics about romantic relationships. Her debut album, Tiara Andini, is also dominated by pop ballads. Five of all eight songs in the album are in the pop ballad genre, such as "Maafkan Aku #terlanjurmencinta" and "365". In "Hadapi Berdua" and "Gemintang Hatiku", she explored her musical prowess in dance pop genre and also showcased her dancing ability. Lastly in the song "Buktikan", Tiara explores her ability in the R&B pop genre.

Stage name 

After graduating from Indonesian Idol, Tiara changed her stage name which was previously called Tiara Anugrah (when she competed) to Tiara Andini. She felt that Anugrah was "quite difficult to pronounce". Therefore, Tiara chose to use Andini as her stage name which was taken from her last name. Before choosing Tiara Andini as her new stage name, she consulted with her parents and management.

Personal life 
Tiara currently lives in Serpong, Greater Jakarta, Indonesia after moving there in 2020. Her native language is Javanese, and she also speaks Indonesian and English with Javanese accent. In March 2022, Tiara began dating YouTuber Alshad Ahmad.

Discography

Studio album

Extended play

Compilation album

Singles

As lead artist

As featured artist

Promotional singles

Music video

Filmography

Film

Television series

Television shows

Special broadcasts

Tour

As the lead artist 
 Bahaya (Mantan) Terindah Live Tour (2022)

Guest star and as featured artist 
 Rossa 25 Shining Years Concert, Surabaya & Bandung (2022)

International music festival 
 Java Jazz Festival, JIExpo Kemayoran (2022)
 UMUSIC FansVerse , Philippines (2022)

Awards and nominations 

|-
! scope="row" rowspan="18"| 2020
| rowspan="5"|Dashyatnya Awards
| Outstanding Song
| "Gemintang Hatiku"
| 
| rowspan="5"|
|-
| Outstanding Host
| Tiara Andini
| 
|-
| Outstanding Newcomer
|Tiara Andini
| 
|-
|Outstanding Trio
|Trio JKT 
|
|-
|Outstanding Group
|Group Idol 
|
|-
| rowspan="2"|RCTI+ Indonesian Digital Awards
| Most Favorite Live Chat Plus Celebrity 
| Lyodra Ginting & Tiara Andini
| 
|rowspan=2|
|-
| Digital Darling Female
| Tiara Andini
| 
|-
|Ambyar Awards
|Cover Song Singer
|"Pamer Bojo"
| 
|
|-
| rowspan="1"|Silet Awards
|Slitted Newcomer
|Tiara Andini
| 
|
|-
| rowspan="3"|Anugerah Musik Indonesia
|Best Newcomer
| "Gemintang Hatiku"
| 
|rowspan=3|
|-
|Best Female Pop Solo Artist
|"Maafkan Aku #terlanjurmencinta"
| 
|-
|Best Production Works
|"Maafkan Aku #terlanjurmencinta"
|
|-
| Mnet Asian Music Awards
| Best New Asian Artist Indonesia
| "Gemintang Hatiku"
| 
|
|-
| rowspan="3"|Local Music Hero Jak FM
| Favorite Female Hero
| Tiara Andini
| 
|rowspan=3|
|-
| Favorite Sad Song
| "Maafkan Aku #terlanjurmencinta"
| 
|-
| Favorite Song
|"Maafkan Aku #terlanjurmencinta"
| 
|-
| rowspan="1"|Resso Indonesia Anthem Awards 
|Song to Sing Together
|"Maafkan Aku #terlanjurmencinta"
|
|
|-
| rowspan="1"| Kiss Awards
|Most Kiss Newcomer
| Tiara Andini
| 
|
|-
! scope="row" rowspan="15" |2021
| Telkomsel Awards
| Favorite Song
|"Maafkan Aku #terlanjurmencinta"
| 
|
|-
| rowspan="2"|JOOX Indonesia Music Awards
| Indonesian Song of the Year
|"Maafkan Aku #terlanjurmencinta"
|
|rowspan=2|
|-
| Indonesian Artist of the Year
|Tiara Andini
| 
|-
| rowspan="2" |RCTI+ Indonesian Digital Awards
|Digital Darling Female
|Tiara Andini
|
|rowspan=2|
|-
|Most Favorite Host 
|Dahsyatnya 2021 
|
|-
| rowspan="1"|Obsesi Awards
|Obsessed Young Celebrities
|Tiara Andini
| 
|
|-
| rowspan="4"|Anugerah Musik Indonesia
|Best Female Pop Solo Artist
| "365"
| 
|rowspan=4|
|-
|Best Album
|Arti untuk Cinta 
| 
|-
|Best Pop Album
|Arti untuk Cinta 
| 
|-
|Best Collaborative Production Works 
|"Cintanya Aku" 
| 
|-
| rowspan="3"|Indonesian Music Awards
|Social Media Artist of the Year 
|"Hadapi Berdua"
| 
|rowspan=3|
|-
|Album of the Year 
|Arti untuk Cinta 
| 
|-
|Collaboration of the Year 
|"Cintanya Aku" 
|
|-
| rowspan="1"|Line Today Choice
|Most Favorite Indonesian Singer
|Tiara Andini
| 
|rowspan=1|
|-
| rowspan="1" | Angket Mustang Awards
| Most Prolific Singer
| Tiara Andini
| 
|  Rowspan=1|
|-
! scope="row" rowspan="14" |2022
|Kiss Awards
|Most Kiss Female Pop Singer
|Tiara Andini
| 
|
|-
|TikTok Awards Indonesia
|Musician of the Years
|Tiara Andini
| 
|
|-
| rowspan="3"|SCTV Music Awards
|Most Popular Female Solo Singer
|Tiara Andini
| 
|rowspan="3"|
|-
|Most Popular Collaboration
|"Memilih Aku" 
| 
|-
|Most Social Media Singer
|Tiara Andini
| 
|-
|rowspan="4" |Joox Top Music Awards
|rowspan="3" |Top Local Song
|Menjadi Dia
|
|
|-
|Janji Setia
|
|
|-
|rowspan="2" |Merasa Indah
|
|
|-
|Global Fans Pick
|
|
|-
|rowspan="3" |Anugerah Musik Indonesia
|Best Pop Album
|rowspan="2" |Tiara Andini (Album)
|
|
|-
|Best Album
|
|
|-
|Best Re-arrangement Production Work
|Buktikan 
|
|
|-
|Silet Awards
|Slitted New Couples
|Tiara Andini & Alshad Ahmad
|
|
|-
|Indonesian Music Awards
|Album of The Year
|Tiara Andini (Album)
|
|

 

 Awards that do not have a nomination list and only the winners announced by the jury are written separately in the subtitles of the special awards.

Special awards 
 Tiara received YouTube Creator Awards in the form of a Silver Creator Award on June 24, 2020, because her YouTube channel has reached 100 thousand subscribers.
 Tiara received the 2020 Social Media Awards which was managed by Marketing magazine and based on the results of research conducted by an independent institution, MediaWave in the Female Singer category for the extraordinary positive sentiment on social media.
 Tiara received an award from the YouTube Partner Summit 2020, because her second single entitled "Maafkan Aku #terlanjurmencinta" managed to stay on the YouTube trending chart for 28 consecutive weeks.
 Tiara received YouTube Creator Awards in the form of Gold Creator Award on February 22, 2021, because her YouTube channel has reached 1 million subscribers.
 Tiara along with nine other women won the Indonesia's Beautiful Women 2021 award which was held by HighEnd magazine.

Endorsements

Brand ambassador 
Along with her career, Tiara has also been appointed as a brand ambassador for several products, including:
 Smartfren (2020)
 Hanasui (2021—2022)
 Good Day (2021—present)
 Lazada (2022—present)
 Campina Ice Cream (2022—present)

Commercial star 
 Smartfren 1ON+ (2020)
 Samsung Galaxy A series (2020) 
 Good Day Mocacinno (2021) 
 Hanasui Vitamin C + Collagen Serum (2021)
 Lazada Festival Belanja 11.11 (2021)
 Samsung Galaxy A Series 5G (2022) 
 Lazada 6.6 Sale (2022)
 Uniqlo #ColorDanceChallenge (2022) 
 Lazada 7.7 Mid-Year Sale (2022)

Notes

References

External links

 
 
 
 
 

Living people
2001 births
Indonesian pop singers
People from Jember Regency
21st-century Indonesian women singers
Indonesian actresses
Indonesian film actresses
Indonesian television actresses
Universal Music Group artists
Indonesian people of Dutch descent